Coleophora pseudociconiella is a moth of the family Coleophoridae. It is found in Sardinia, Italy, Croatia, Austria, the Czech Republic, Slovakia, Hungary, Romania, Bulgaria, Ukraine, Russia and Asia Minor.

Adults are on wing in August.

References

pseudociconiella
Moths of Europe
Moths of Asia
Moths described in 1952